Colonial elections were held in South Australia from 20 February to 13 March 1865. All 36 seats in the South Australian House of Assembly were up for election.

The instability of governments continued in the three years following the 1862 election. George Waterhouse forming government after the election, was replaced by Francis Dutton in 1863, Henry Ayers in 1864, who reshuffled his team after one year, and by Arthur Blyth after only a further 11 days.

Since the inaugural 1857 election, no parties or solid groupings had been formed, which resulted in frequent changes of the Premier. If for any reason the incumbent Premier of South Australia lost sufficient support through a successful motion of no confidence at any time on the floor of the house, he would tender his resignation to the Governor of South Australia, which would result in another member deemed to have the support of the House of Assembly being sworn in by the Governor as the next Premier.

Informal groupings began and increased government stability occurred from the 1887 election. The United Labor Party would be formed in 1891, while the National Defence League would be formed later in the same year.

See also
Premier of South Australia

Notes

References
History of South Australian elections 1857-2006, volume 1: ECSA
Statistical Record of the Legislature 1836-2007: SA Parliament

Elections in South Australia
1865 elections in Australia
1860s in South Australia
February 1865 events
March 1865 events